Aleksandar Aleksandrov (born 13 April 1986 in Shumen) is a Bulgarian retired footballer who played as a defender.

Career
Aleksandrov's first club was Volov Shumen. In June 2003, while he was 17 years old, Aleksandrov signed with Chernomorets Burgas and made his debut in the A Group. In the summer of 2005, due to the big financial crisis at the club, he was released and several weeks later he accepted the offer from Cherno More Varna.

Cherno More 
Aleksandrov made his league debut for Cherno More on 17 September 2005, appearing as a substitute in a 4–0 home win against Belasitsa Petrich. On 29 April 2006, he scored his first goal and the winner in Cherno More's away game at Pirin Blagoevgrad, a 1–0 win. In his first season playing for Cherno More, he made 21 appearances in the A PFG.

His second goal for the club came in a 2–1 win over Chernomorets Burgas on 20 October 2007, his first goal at Cherno More's Ticha stadium.

On 1 November 2008, Aleksandrov scored Cherno More's second goal in their 3–0 victory over Sliven 2000. On 29 November, he scored his second goal of the 2008–09 season in a 4–0 home win against Minyor Pernik.

On 5 April 2011, Aleksandrov was sent off against CSKA Sofia in a 2–0 defeat of the Bulgarian Cup, his first red card in a Cherno More shirt. Two weeks later, he signed a two-year contract extension, keeping him at Cherno More until 2013.

Ludogorets Razgrad 
Aleksandrov signed with Bulgarian champions Ludogorets Razgrad in January 2014 and made his first A Group appearance for the team on 30 March 2014, playing the full 90 minutes in the 1–1 home draw against Botev Plovdiv.

Return to Cherno More 
On 18 June 2017, Aleksandrov was announced as Cherno More's new signing. On 28 July 2017, he made his second debut in a 1–0 home win over Dunav Ruse, coming on as substitute for Mariyan Ognyanov. On 14 December 2017, his contract was terminated by mutual consent.

International career
Between 2006 and 2008 Aleksandrov played for the Bulgaria national under-21 football team.
In March, 2008, the Bulgarian national coach Plamen Markov called Aleksandar in the Bulgaria national football team for the friendly match with Finland. Lyuboslav Penev gave him his debut on 30 May 2013 in an away friendly against Japan when Aleksandar came on as a substitute for the injured Iliya Milanov. On 7 February 2015, he played the full 90 minutes of the 0:0 draw with Romania in a non-official friendly match. On 28 March 2015, he was a starter and remained on the pitch over the course of the entire match in the 2:2 tie with Italy in a Euro 2016 qualifier, which marked new manager Ivaylo Petev's official debut.

Career statistics

Honours

Club 
Ludogorets
 Bulgarian A Group (2): 2013–14, 2014–15
 Bulgarian Cup. (1): 2013–14
 Bulgarian Supercup (1): 2014

References

External links
 
 Profile at LevskiSofia.info
 

1986 births
Living people
People from Shumen
Bulgarian footballers
Bulgaria under-21 international footballers
Bulgaria international footballers
Association football defenders
First Professional Football League (Bulgaria) players
Second Professional Football League (Bulgaria) players
FC Chernomorets Burgas players
PFC Cherno More Varna players
PFC Ludogorets Razgrad players
PFC Levski Sofia players